Horatio Caro  (5 July 1862 – 15 December 1920) was an English chess player.

Caro was born in Newcastle upon Tyne, England, but spent most of his chess career in Berlin, Germany having moved there when he was two years old.

He played several matches. In 1892, he drew with Curt von Bardeleben (+2 –2 =2) and lost to Szymon Winawer (+2 –3 =1). In 1897, he was defeated by Jacques Mieses (+3 –4 =3). In 1903, he drew with Bardeleben (+4 –4 =0). In 1905, he won against Moritz Lewitt (+4 –3 =5). In tournaments, he won in Berlin in 1888, 1891, 1894, 1898 (jointly), and 1903. He also took 10th at Berlin 1883, took 4th at Berlin 1887, tied for 2nd-3rd at Nuremberg 1888, took 3rd at Berlin 1889, took 2nd at Berlin 1890. He took 3rd at Berlin 1894, took 9th at Berlin 1897, took 17th at Vienna 1898, took 4th at Berlin 1899, tied for 6-7th at Berlin 1902, tied for 11-12th at Coburg 1904, tied for 7-8th at Barmen 1905, took 9th at Berlin 1907, tied for 3-5th at Berlin 1908, and took 4th at Berlin 1911.

Caro died in London aged 58. He was discharged from a workhouse in Whitechapel citing his death as the reason.

He is known for the Caro-Kann Defence (B12), an opening which he analysed along with Marcus Kann and jointly published about on the German journal Brüderschaft in 1886. He is also known for beating World Champion Emanuel Lasker in 1890, and for his appearance in the 1898 Anglo-American cable chess match.

External links
 
 "The Caro-Kann Defence" by Edward Winter

References

1862 births
1920 deaths

English chess players
Chess theoreticians
German chess players
German chess writers
German male non-fiction writers